William Tulio Divale was a professor of anthropology at York College, City University of New York in Jamaica, New York, USA. He died in 2020 at the age of 78.

Divale was a past chairman of the Social Sciences Department. He received his PhD degree from the University at Buffalo in 1974. He is the publisher of the 
World Cultures eJournal.

He has received two medals for one of his specialties, cross-cultural studies. He was also Past President of the Society for Cross-Cultural Research (2000) and is the current president again (2009).

He also co-authored the book (with James Joseph) "I Lived Inside The Campus Revolution." (1970) Cowles Book Co, New York, and authored "Matrilocal Residence In Pre-Literate Societies." (1984) Ann Arbor: UMI Research Press. He has also authored over 25 publications in scientific journals.

He has conducted fieldwork in La Gomera, Canary Islands (1973–76), and in the Republic of Moldova (Eastern Europe) (2005–Present).

Admitted government spy and informant.  The known amount of this is disclosed in his book "I Lived Inside the Campus Revolution".

Select publications 
Mylonas, K., Furnham, A., Konstantinidis, E., Papazoglou, S., Divale, W., Leblebici, C., Gondim, S., Moniz, A., Grad, H., Alvaro, J.-L., Cretu, R.-Z., Filus, A., & Boski, P. 
2013. The Explanations for Unemployment Scale: An Eight-Country Study on Factor Equivalence.  In Y. Kashima, E. Kashima, & R. Beatson (Eds.), Steering the cultural dynamics: Selected papers from the 2010 Congress of the International Association for Cross-Cultural Psychology. Melbourne, Australia: International Association for Cross-Cultural Psychology. Accessed via www.iaccp.org

Rebecca Rivera-Maestre and William Divale
2011	Interdisciplinary Linkages: Joint Group Wiki Projects between Anthropology and Social Work Courses.  DisCover: A Journal of Scholarly Teaching, Vol 3: 9-27		

William Divale, Vadim Aftene, Vadim Moldovan, Anatol Nacu  
2011. Parental Acceptance-Rejection and Influence of Father-Absence on the Chronically Mentally Ill
in Moldova (Eastern Europe).  In, Kourkoutas, Ε. & Erkman, F. (Eds.).  Interpersonal Acceptance and
Rejection: Social, Emotional, and Educational Contexts.  Boca Raton, FL: Brown Walker Press, pps
163-172

Vadim Moldovan, Ph.D., William Divale, Ph.D., Constantin Turcan, M.D.,  Anatol Carpa, M.D.,  Anatol Nacu, PhD./M.D.,  Alexander Socrovisciuc, M.D., Vladimir Sterpu, M.D./Ph.D.,  Virginia Fauras, M.D.,  Vadim Aftene, M.D.,  Daniel Paladiciuc, M.D., Ludmila Petrova, M.D.,  Maria Victoria Cardona-Divale, M.A., E. Ed. 
(2008) Services for the Chronically Mentally Ill in Moldova:  A Struggle to Survive. The International Journal of Mental Health, Vol. 36, No. 4. 46-56

Sonjia Kenya, Robert Fullilove, John Allegrante, William Divale, and Mitchell Brodsky 
2003	Effects of Immigration on Select Risk Behaviors of Black College Students.  Journal of American College Health 52(3): 113-120

Daria Khaltourina, Andrey Korotayev & William Divale 
2002	A Corrected Version of the Standard Cross-Cultural Sample Database.  World Cultures 13(1): 62-98

Julie Ann Kishna and William Divale
2001	Internet Survey on the Effects of Immigration and Saturated Fat and Cholesterol Intake of Guyanese. World Cultures 12(2):153-178

Divale, William
2001	Codes on Highest Number Counted for the Standard Sample. World Cultures, 12(1):98-103

Divale, William and Albert Seda
2000	Modernization as Changes in Cultural Complexity:  New Cross-Cultural Measurements.  Journal of Cross-Cultural Research.  Vol. 34(3).

2000	Cross-Cultural Codes on Modernization.  World Cultures  11(2): 152-170

Wm. Divale 
1999 	Climatic Instability, Food Storage, and the Development of Numerical Counting:  A Cross-Cultural Study.  Journal of Cross-Cultural Research. 33(4),341-368

Wm. Divale and Albert Seda.  
1999   	Codes on Gossip for Societies in the Standard Sample.  World Cultures: Journal of Comparative and Cross-Cultural Research.  Vol  10(1):7-22.

Wm. Divale, Noelle Abrams, Jennifer Barzola, Estelle Harris, and Fred-Michael Henry.  
1998	Sleeping Arrangements of Children and Adolescents:  SCCS Sample Codes. World Cultures: Journal of Comparative and Cross-Cultural Research.  World Cultures 9, 3-12.

Wm. Divale and Stanley R. Witkowski
1996	Kin Groups, Residence, and Descent.  In Encyclopedia of Cultural Anthropology. 
3:673-679.  New York:  Henry Holt and Company.

Wm. Divale
1995	Cold Symptoms and Emotional Dissatisfaction Among Rural/Urban and Culturally Diverse High School Students.  Journal of Cross-Cultural Research.  29(1):27-42.

1984	Matrilocal Residence In Pre-Literate Societies.  Ann Arbor:  UMI Research Press.

Wm. Divale and Marvin Harris
1978	The Male Supremacist Complex:  Discovery of a Cultural Invention.  American 
Anthropologist  80(3):668-671.

Wm. Divale,  Marvin Harris, and Donald T. Williams
1978	On the Mis-Use of Statistics:  A Reply to Hirschfield et al.  American Anthropologist 80(2):379-386.

R. Rohner, R. Naroll, H. Barry, Wm. Divale et al. 
1978	Guidelines for Holocultural Research.  Current Anthropology  19(1):128-129.

Wm. Divale and Marvin Harris
1978	Reply to Lancaster and Lancaster.  American Anthropologist  80(1):117-118.

Wm. Divale and Clifford Zipin
1977	Hunting and the Development of Sign Language:  A Cross-Cultural Test.  Journal of Anthropological Research  33(2):185-201.

Wm. Divale
1977	Living Floor Area and Marital Residence:  A Replication.  Behavior Science Research 12:109-115.

1977	From Correlations to Causes:  A New and Simple Method for Causal Analysis in Cross-Cultural Research.  Annals Of The New York Academy Of Sciences  vol.285:66-74. 
Volume titled:  "Issues in Cross-Cultural Research,"  Leonore Loeb Adler, ed.

1977	A Cross-Cultural Test of Stratification versus Alliance Theory.  Current Anthropology 18:451-453.

1976	Female Status and Cultural Evolution:  A Study in Ethnographer Bias.  Behavior Science Research  11:169-211.

Wm. Divale and Marvin Harris
1976	Population, Warfare, and the Male Supremacist Complex.  American Anthropologist  
78:521-538.

Wm. Divale
1976	Newspapers:  Some Guidelines for Communicating Anthropology.  Human Organization 
35:183-191.

Raoul Naroll and Wm. Divale
1976	Natural Selection in Cultural Evolution:  Warfare versus Peaceful Diffusion.  American Ethnologist  3:97-128.

Wm. Divale,  F. Chamberis, and D. Gangloff
1976	War, Peace and Marital Residence in Pre-Industrial Societies.  Journal of Conflict Resolution 20:57-78.

Wm. Divale   
1976	Using Date of European Contact for Time-Lagged Variables in Cross-Cultural Surveys. Behavior Science Research  11:30-55.  HRAF Cross-Cultural Research Award, 1975.

1975 	An Explanation for Matrilocal Residence. In, Being Female: Reproduction, Power,
and Change. Dana Raphael, ed. The Hague: Mouton, pp. 99–108.

1975 	Temporal Focus and Random Error in Cross-Cultural Hypothesis Tests. 
Behavior Science Research 10:19-36

1975 	The Causes Of Matrilocal Residence: A Cross-Ethnohistorical Survey. Ann Arbor:
University Microfilms, No. 75-7742. Abstracted in Dissertation Abstracts International 
35(10):6286-6287.

1974 	Migration, External Warfare, and Matrilocal Residence. Behavior Science Research 9:75-133.

1973 	Warfare In Primitive Societies: A Bibliography. Santa Barbara and Oxford:
ABC-ClioPress. 2nd Revised Edition.

1973 	The Cognatic-Affinal Paradox in the Egyptian Myth of Osiris: A Critical Application of the Structural Method. New York Folklore Quarterly 29:287-303.

1973 	Science in the News. Saturday Review Of Literature (Sciences) 1(2):56.

1972 	Systemic Population Control in the Middle and Upper Paleolithic: Inferences Based on
Contemporary Hunter-Gatherers. World Archaeology 4:222-243.

1972 	Some Guidelines for Disseminating Anthropology Through Newspapers. Media
Anthropologist 1(2):1-2.

1971 	Science-Writers and Science Reporting. California Anthropologist 1(2):47-60.
California State University at Los Angeles.

1971 	Ibo Population Control: The Ecology of Warfare and Social Organization. California Anthropologist 1(1):10-24. California State University at Los Angeles.

1971 	Warfare In Primitive Societies: A Selected Bibliography. Los Angeles: Center for
the Study of Armament and Disarmament.

1970 	An Explanation for Primitive Warfare: Population Control and the Significance of Primitive Sex Ratios. New Scholar 2:172-193.

References

External links 
 CUNY Social Sciences Department 
 Divale web page

American anthropologists
University at Buffalo alumni
Cross-cultural studies
York College, City University of New York faculty
20th-century American male writers
21st-century American male writers
1942 births
2020 deaths